Horner Rennbahn is a metro station on the Hamburg U-Bahn lines U2 and U4. The underground station was opened in January 1967 and is located in the Hamburg district of Horn, Germany. Horn is part of the borough of Hamburg-Mitte.

Service

Trains 
Horner Rennbahn  is served by Hamburg U-Bahn lines U2 and U4; departures are every 5 minutes.

See also 

 List of Hamburg U-Bahn stations

References

External links 

 Line and route network plans at hvv.de 

Hamburg U-Bahn stations in Hamburg
U2 (Hamburg U-Bahn) stations
U4 (Hamburg U-Bahn) stations
Buildings and structures in Hamburg-Mitte
Railway stations in Germany opened in 1967
1967 establishments in West Germany